Washington Township is one of ten townships in Newton County, Indiana. As of the 2010 census, its population was 322 and it contained 142 housing units.

Geography

Unincorporated towns
 Ade at 
 Beaver City at 
(This list is based on USGS data and may include former settlements.)

Education
Washington Township residents may obtain a free library card from the Brook-Iroquois Township Public Library in Brook.

References

External links
 Indiana Township Association
 United Township Association of Indiana

Townships in Newton County, Indiana
Townships in Indiana